Butternut may refer to:
 Butternut (tree), Juglans cinerea, a species of walnut tree commonly called a butternut tree
Butternut squash, Cucurbita moschata, an edible winter squash
USS Butternut (YAG-60), a 1941 ship of the United States Navy
 Butternut Breads, a regional brand marketed by Flowers Foods
 Butternut (people), a nineteenth century term for southern settlers of the American old Northwest

Places
Butternut, Wisconsin, a village
Butternuts, New York, a town
Butternut, Minnesota, an unincorporated community
Butternut Lake (Meeker County, Minnesota), a lake
Butternut Valley Township, Blue Earth County, Minnesota, a township
Ski Butternut, a ski resort in Great Barrington, Massachusetts

See also
 
 Butternut Creek (disambiguation)
 Butternut Valley (disambiguation)